Karim Bridji (born 16 August 1981) is an Algerian former professional footballer. He played as a midfielder.

Club career
Bridji started his playing career at the Ajax Amsterdam Academy where he was captain of the team. He played one season with the senior squad before leaving to join Belgian giants RSC Anderlecht. After spending another season on the bench without any playing time, he joined another Jupiler League squad, KSC Aalst, where he featured 15 times and scored 2 goals. The following season, he returned to his native Netherlands to join FC Volendam who were playing in the second division, helping them win promotion to the Eredivisie, making 21 appearances and scoring 1 goal along the way. He played two more seasons with FC Volendam before joining another Dutch team, Helmond Sport. He would have a breakout year with them, making 38 appearances and scoring 12 goals. His performance earned him a contract with Eredivisie side Heracles Almelo, for which he played three seasons before he was released because of injuries in the summer of 2009. In September 2010, Bridji found a new club in RKC. Again due to injuries he only played 12 matches in two seasons, after being released in the summer of 2012. In January 2013, Bridji signed a contract until the end of the season with his former team Helmond Sport, which currently plays in the Dutch Eerste Divisie. On 24 April 2014 it was announced that Bridji would join newly promoted Ajax Zaterdag, the amateur team of AFC Ajax, in the Topklasse. The third tier of professional football in the Netherlands.

International career
Although born in the Netherlands, Algerian Parents, Bridji turned down many call-ups by the Dutch FA preferring to represent Algeria. He actually featured twice for the Dutch Under-21 team but only in friendlies thus preserving his eligibility to play for Algeria.

Bridji was capped by Algeria at the Under-23 level in 2002. He scored 3 goals in his first 3 games for Algeria's U23 team in a tournament against the senior sides of Oman, Palestine and Yemen. He also played in 3 qualifiers for the 2004 Summer Olympics.

He made his debut for the Algerian national team in 2006 when he was called up by Jean-Michel Cavalli for a friendly against Burkina Faso. Bridji started the game and was subbed off in the 70th minute for Ali Boulebda.

Honours

Club
RKC Waalwijk:
Eerste Divisie: 2010–11

References

External links
 Voetbal International profile 

1981 births
Living people
Footballers from Amsterdam
Dutch people of Algerian descent
Association football midfielders
Algerian footballers
Algeria international footballers
Dutch footballers
S.C. Eendracht Aalst players
AFC Ajax players
R.S.C. Anderlecht players
FC Volendam players
Helmond Sport players
Heracles Almelo players
RKC Waalwijk players
AFC Ajax (amateurs) players
Belgian Pro League players
Eredivisie players
Eerste Divisie players
Derde Divisie players
Algerian expatriate footballers
Expatriate footballers in the Netherlands
Algerian expatriate sportspeople in the Netherlands
Algerian expatriate sportspeople in Belgium
Algeria under-23 international footballers